Samuel Adamson (born 27 November 1969) is an Australian playwright and screenwriter who has lived and worked in the UK since 1991. He was born in Adelaide and lives in London.

Career
Samuel Adamson's debut play was Clocks and Whistles at the Bush Theatre in 1996 in a production directed by then-artistic director Dominic Dromgoole, with a cast including Kate Beckinsale, John Light and Neil Stuke. It was later produced in Germany and New York. The play led to him becoming Pearson Writer in Residence at the Bush from 1997 to 1998.

Adamson's second play was Grace Note, starring Geraldine McEwan, in 1997 for the Peter Hall Company at the Old Vic, which was also directed by Dromgoole. His next play was Drink, Dance, Laugh and Lie at the Bush in 1999.

He has written versions of Henrik Ibsen's plays. A Doll's House, directed by Thea Sharrock, was the tenth anniversary production at Southwark Playhouse, London, in 2003, while Pillars of the Community at the Lyttleton at the Royal National Theatre was directed by Marianne Elliott in 2005 and starred Damian Lewis and Lesley Manville.

He also adapted two plays by Anton Chekhov for tours for the Oxford Stage Company, both directed by Dominic Dromgoole: Three Sisters, which transferred to the Whitehall Theatre, and The Cherry Orchard which moved to the Riverside Studios. He adapted Bernhard Studlar's Vienna Dreaming at the National Theatre Studio and Arthur Schnitzler's Professor Bernhardi for Dumbfounded Theatre at the Arcola Theatre in 2005 and also on BBC Radio 3. He also wrote Tomorrow Week for BBC Radio 3.

His play, Southwark Fair, was directed at the Royal National Theatre in 2005 by artistic director Nicholas Hytner, starring Rory Kinnear, Margaret Tyzack and Con O'Neill. His one-woman play Some Kind of Bliss was performed by Lucy Briers at the Royal National Theatre in 2006 and then at the Trafalgar Studios in 2007. He also wrote Fish and Company for the National Youth Theatre and Soho Theatre. In 2005 he contributed to the 24 Hour Plays at the Old Vic and in 2007 to A Chain Play at the Almeida Theatre.

He wrote the screenplay for the 2007 short film, Running For River, starring Romola Garai.

All About My Mother, his stage adaptation of Pedro Almodóvar's film Todo sobre mi madre, was produced to great acclaim at the Old Vic in 2007, starring Lesley Manville and Diana Rigg.

In 2008, he began working with Tori Amos on a musical adaptation of the George MacDonald story The Light Princess for the Royal National Theatre. His play Mrs Affleck, inspired by Ibsen's Little Eyolf, opened at the Royal National Theatre in January 2009, directed by Marianne Elliott and starring Claire Skinner. His adaptation of Truman Capote's Breakfast at Tiffany's, starring Anna Friel and directed by Sean Mathias, opened at the Theatre Royal Haymarket, London in September 2009. A Quiet Island was due to open at the Almeida Theatre, London in 2009, directed by Indhu Rubasingham, but was postponed.

His play Frank and Ferdinand, an interpretation of the story of the Pied Piper, was part of the National Theatre Connections Festival 2011 and was performed by young amateur companies all over Britain. In collaboration with trumpeter Alison Balsom he devised Gabriel, a play using the music of The Fairy Queen and other pieces by Henry Purcell, staged as part of the 2013 summer season at Shakespeare's Globe.

External links
Daily Telegraph interview, February 2006
 Samuel Adamson's page with his agents, The Agency

Notes

English dramatists and playwrights
People from Adelaide
1969 births
Living people
English male dramatists and playwrights